Rankin is an unincorporated community in Andrew County, in the U.S. state of Missouri.

History
Rankin was a small community, located just north of Fillmore during the late nineteenth and early twentieth centuries. A post office in Rankin was in operation from 1894 to 1908. The community was named after John Rankin, the original owner of the town site. A cemetery is the only marker of the past community that remains today, which includes multiple tombstones with the family name Rankin on them.

References

Unincorporated communities in Andrew County, Missouri
Unincorporated communities in Missouri